Cerro Colorados is a mountain in the Andes, at the border of Argentina and Chile. It and the neighbouring peak of Vallecitos lie in a very remote area west of the Salar de Antofalla and were not climbed until 1999. Its slopes are shared between the territory of the Argentinean province of Catamarca (commune of Antofagasta de la Sierra) and the Chilean province of Chañaral (commune of Diego de Almagro).

First Ascent 
Colorados was first climbed by Henri Barret (France), Walter Sinay and Catalino Soriano (Argentina) October 19, 1999.

Elevation 
Other data from available digital elevation models: SRTM yields 6054 metres, ASTER 6035 metres and TanDEM-X 6094 metres. The height of the nearest key col is 4785 meters, leading to a topographic prominence of 1295 meters. Colorados is considered a Mountain Subrange according to the Dominance System  and its dominance is 21.3%. Its parent peak is Vallecitos and the Topographic isolation is 7.3 kilometers.

See also
List of mountains in the Andes

References

Volcanoes of Catamarca Province
Mountains of Argentina
Six-thousanders of the Andes
Mountains of Chile
Stratovolcanoes of Argentina
Stratovolcanoes of Chile